The Bola volcano, also known as Wangore, is an andesitic stratovolcano, located south-west of the Dakataua caldera.

The most recent lava flow was erupted from the summit crater and flowed to the west. This viscous flow is at least 50 m thick, thus leaving an irregularity in the profile of the volcano. The unforested summit crater and weak fumarolic activity suggest that the most recent eruption may have been only a few hundred years ago.

See also
List of volcanoes in Papua New Guinea

References 

Stratovolcanoes of Papua New Guinea
Calderas of Papua New Guinea
Volcanoes of New Britain
Dormant volcanoes
Mountains of Papua New Guinea